Fenretinide (N-(4-hydroxyphenyl)retinamide; 4-HPR) (INN) is a synthetic retinoid derivative. Retinoids are substances related to vitamin A.  It has been investigated for potential use in the treatment of cancer, as well as in the treatment of cystic fibrosis, rheumatoid arthritis, acne, psoriasis, and has been found to also slow the production and accumulation of a toxin that leads to vision loss in Stargardt's patients.

In cancer studies, Fenretinide treatment may cause ceramide (a wax-like substance) to build up in tumor cells and is associated with the accumulation of reactive oxygen species (ROS), resulting in cell death through apoptosis and/or necrosis. Fenretinide accumulates preferentially in fatty tissue such as the breast, which may contribute to the effectiveness of fenretinide against breast cancer.  Phase III clinical trial data has suggested that fenretinide reduces breast cancer relapse in pre-menopausal women.  Common side effects associated with fenretinide treatment include skin dryness and night-blindness, which is reversible upon cessation of treatment.  Specific types of cancer under investigation include or have included ovarian, prostate, cervical, lung, renal, bladder, breast, glioma, skin, head and neck carcinoma, non-Hodgkin's lymphoma, neuroblastoma, and Ewing's sarcoma.

References

External links 
 Numerous references and links to current and past clinical trials and studies of fenretinide can be found at the Journal of Clinical Oncology website

Retinoids
Anilides
Phenols
Cyclohexenes
Experimental cancer drugs